The Fiji whistler (Pachycephala vitiensis) is a species of bird in the family Pachycephalidae, endemic to Fiji.

Taxonomy and systematics
It was variably considered a subspecies of a widespread golden whistler (P. pectoralis). Three of the subspecies (P. v. kandavensis, lauana, and vitiensis) of the former white-throated whistler (P. v. kandavensis, lauana, and vitiensis) were lumped with the Fiji whistler in 2014 by the IOC. The Temotu whistler was formerly considered conspecific with the Fiji whistler.

Subspecies
Ten subspecies are recognized:
 P. v. kandavensis - Ramsay, 1876: Originally described as a separate species. Found on Kadavu
 P. v. lauana - Mayr, 1932: Found in southern Lau Islands
 P. v. vitiensis - Gray, G.R. 1860: Found on Gau Island
 P. v. bella - Mayr, 1932: Found on Vatu Vara
 P. v. koroana - Mayr, 1932: Found on Koro Island
 Taveuni whistler (P. v. torquata), or Taveuni Island golden whistler - Layard, EL, 1875: Originally described as a separate species. Found on Taveuni Island
 P. v. aurantiiventris - Seebohm, 1891: Originally described as a separate species. Found on Yanganga and Vanua Levu 
 P. v. ambigua - Mayr, 1932: Found on southeast Vanua Levu, Rabi, and Kioa 
 P. v. optata - Hartlaub, 1866: Originally described as a separate species. Found on south-eastern Viti Levu and Ovalau 
 P. v. graeffii - Hartlaub, 1866: Originally described as a separate species. Found on Waya and Viti Levu

Description
Some of the subspecies of the Fiji whistler are yellow-throated, while others are white-throated. It has been speculated that these two groups are the result of separate waves of colonisations, with the yellow-throated being the result of an early colonisation, and the white-throated the result of a secondary colonisation. The yellow-throated are found on most northern and central islands (Vanua Levu, Viti Levu, Taveuni, Ovalau, Kioa, Rabi, Koro and Vatu Vara), while the white-throated are found on some southern islands (Kadavu, Gau and southern Lau Islands.

Vocalisations

References

Fiji whistler
Endemic birds of Fiji
Fiji whistler
Fiji whistler